The 14th Independent Spirit Awards, honoring the best in independent filmmaking for 1998, were announced on March 20, 1999.  It was hosted by Queen Latifah.

Nominees and winners

{| class="wikitable"
!Best Feature
!Best Director
|-
|Gods and Monsters

Affliction
Claire Dolan
A Soldier's Daughter Never Cries
Velvet Goldmine
|Wes Anderson – Rushmore

Todd Haynes – Velvet Goldmine
Lodge Kerrigan – Claire Dolan
Paul Schrader – Affliction
Todd Solondz – Happiness
|-
!Best Male Lead
!Best Female Lead
|-
|Ian McKellen – Gods and Monsters

Dylan Baker – Happiness
Nick Nolte – Affliction
Sean Penn – Hurlyburly
Courtney B. Vance – Blind Faith
|Ally Sheedy – High Art

Katrin Cartlidge – Claire Dolan
Christina Ricci – The Opposite of Sex
Robin Tunney – Niagara, Niagara
Alfre Woodard – Down in the Delta
|-
!Best Supporting Male
!Best Supporting Female
|-
|Bill Murray – Rushmore

James Coburn – Affliction
Charles S. Dutton – Blind Faith
Gary Farmer – Smoke Signals
Philip Seymour Hoffman – Happiness
|Lynn Redgrave – Gods and Monsters

Stockard Channing – The Baby Dance
Patricia Clarkson – High Art
Lisa Kudrow – The Opposite of Sex
Joely Richardson – Under Heaven
|-
!Best Screenplay
!Best First Screenplay
|-
|The Opposite of Sex – Don RoosAffliction – Paul Schrader
Blind Faith – Frank Military
Gods and Monsters – Bill Condon
The Spanish Prisoner – David Mamet
| – Darren AronofskyHigh Art – Lisa Cholodenko
Niagara, Niagara – Matthew Weiss
Slums of Beverly Hills – Tamara Jenkins
Smoke Signals – Sherman Alexie
|-
!Best First Feature
!Best Debut Performance
|-
|The Opposite of Sex

Buffalo '66
High Art

Slums of Beverly Hills
|Evan Adams – Smoke Signals

Anthony Roth Costanzo – A Soldier's Daughter Never Cries
Andrea Hart – Miss Monday
Sonja Sohn – Slam
Saul Williams – Slam
|-
!Best Cinematography
!Best Foreign Film
|-
|Velvet Goldmine – Maryse AlbertiAffliction – Paul Sarossy
Belly – Malik Hassan Sayeed
High Art – Tami Reiker
 – Matthew Libatique
|The Celebration • DenmarkCentral Station • Brazil
The Eel • Japan
Fireworks • Japan
The General • Ireland
|}

 Films that received multiple nominations 

 Films that won multiple awards 

Special awards

Truer Than Fiction AwardRegret to Inform
Dear Jesse
Dying to Tell the Story
Moment of Impact
Paulina

Producers Award
Susan A. Stover – The Sticky Fingers of Time & High Art
Margot Bridger – Arresting Gena & The Delta
Gill Holland – Hurricane Streets & Spring Forward
Andrea Sperling – Nowhere & The Doom Generation

Someone to Watch Award
David D. Williams – Thirteen
Tony Barbieri – One
Lynn Hershman Leeson – Conceiving Ada
Eric Tretbar – Snow

References

External links 
1998 Spirit Awards at IMDb
Full show on Film Independent's YouTube channel

1998
Independent Spirit Awards